Heterogastridae is a family of lygaeoid bugs consisting of about 20 genera and more than 100 species.

The group has been considered a subfamily, tribe and subtribe, but most recently has been restored to family status.

Genera
These 20 genera belong to the family Heterogastridae:

 Artemidorus Distant, 1903
 Boccharis Distant, 1904
 Depressignus Scudder, 1962
 Dinomachellus Scudder, 1957
 Dinomachus Distant, 1901
 Eranchiellus Scudder, 1957
 Heterogaster Schilling, 1829
 Hyginellus Distant, 1913
 Hyginus Stal, 1859
 Masoas Distant, 1906
 Minigellus Scudder, 1962
 Nerthus Distant, 1909
 Parasadoletus Malipatil, 2020
 Parathyginus Scudder, 1957
 Platyplax Fieber, 1860
 Sadoletus Distant, 1904
 Thyrothanus Scudder, 1957
 Trinithignus Scudder, 1962
 Walkothignus Scudder, 1968
 Woodwardothignus Slater, 1981

References

Heteroptera families
Lygaeoidea